The United States Court of Appeals for the Fifth Circuit (in case citations, 5th Cir.) is a federal court with appellate jurisdiction over the district courts in the following federal judicial districts:

 Eastern District of Louisiana
 Middle District of Louisiana
 Western District of Louisiana
 Northern District of Mississippi
 Southern District of Mississippi
 Eastern District of Texas
 Northern District of Texas
 Southern District of Texas
 Western District of Texas

The Fifth Circuit has 17 active judgeships, and is headquartered at the John Minor Wisdom United States Court of Appeals Building in New Orleans, Louisiana, with the clerk's office located at the F. Edward Hebert Federal Building in New Orleans.

Originally, the Fifth Circuit also included the federal district courts in Alabama, Georgia, and Florida. In 1981, the district courts for those states were transferred to the newly created U.S. Court of Appeals for the Eleventh Circuit.

History of the court 

This court was created by the Evarts Act on June 16, 1891, which moved the circuit judges and appellate jurisdiction from the Circuit Courts of the Fifth Circuit to this court. At the time of its creation, the Fifth Circuit covered Florida, Georgia, Alabama, Mississippi, Louisiana, and Texas.

On June 25, 1948, the Panama Canal Zone was added to the Fifth Circuit by 62 Stat. 870.  The Fifth Circuit gained appellate jurisdiction over the United States District Court for the Canal Zone.

On October 1, 1981, under , the Fifth Circuit was split: Alabama, Georgia, and Florida were moved to the new Eleventh Circuit.

On March 31, 1982, the Fifth Circuit lost jurisdiction over the Panama Canal Zone, which was transferred to Panamanian control.

The Fifth Circuit Four 
During the late 1950s, Chief Judge Elbert Tuttle and three of his colleagues (John Minor Wisdom, John Brown, and Richard Rives) became known as the "Fifth Circuit Four", or simply "The Four", for decisions crucial in advancing the civil rights of African Americans. In this, they were usually opposed by their fellow Fifth Circuit Judge, Benjamin F. Cameron of Mississippi, until his death in 1964.

Hurricane Katrina 
Hurricane Katrina struck New Orleans on August 29, 2005, devastating the city and slightly damaging the John Minor Wisdom Courthouse. All deadlines concerning filings were extended. The court temporarily relocated its administrative operations to Houston, and returned to normal operations in New Orleans in March 2007.

Current composition of the court 
:

Vacancies and pending nominations

List of former judges

Chief judges

Succession of seats

See also 
 Courts of Louisiana
 Courts of Mississippi
 Courts of Texas
 Judicial appointment history for United States federal courts#Fifth Circuit
 List of current United States Circuit Judges

References

External links 

 United States Court of Appeals for the Fifth Circuit
 Recent Fifth Circuit opinions from FindLaw
 Criminal law opinions from the Fifth Circuit
 Business litigation opinions from the Fifth Circuit

 
New Orleans
1891 establishments in the United States
Courts and tribunals established in 1891